
Gmina Niedźwiada is a rural gmina (administrative district) in Lubartów County, Lublin Voivodeship, in eastern Poland.

Villages
Gmina Niedźwiada contains the villages and settlements of Berejów, Brzeźnica Bychawska, Brzeźnica Bychawska-Kolonia, Brzeźnica Książęca, Brzeźnica Książęca-Kolonia, Brzeźnica Leśna, Górka Lubartowska, Klementynów, Niedźwiada, Niedźwiada-Kolonia, Pałecznica, Pałecznica-Kolonia, Tarło, Tarło-Kolonia, Zabiele and Zabiele-Kolonia.

Neighbouring gminas
Gmina Niedźwiada is bordered by the town of Lubartów and by the gminas of Lubartów, Ostrów Lubelski, Ostrówek, Parczew, Serniki and Siemień.

References

Polish official population figures 2006
Description at www.rootsweb.com

Niedzwiada
Lubartów County